The 2014 National Premier Soccer League season was the 102nd season of FIFA-sanctioned soccer in the United States, and the 12th season of the NPSL. The season began in May 2014. RVA Football Club were the defending champions, having won their first NPSL title the previous season.

Changes from 2013
The league added a new Northwest Conference in the West Region in 2014. The league also split the Great Lakes Conference into two separate conferences, Great Lakes East and Great Lakes West. The Mid-Atlantic Conference was split in two with teams from Virginia and Maryland staying within the Conference and moving to the Northeast Region (including defending Champion RVA Football Club) and the remaining teams forming the new South Atlantic Conference.  The Atlantic Conference was also renamed the North Atlantic Conference. The following changes regarding team relocation, rebranding, or expansion are effective for the 2014 NPSL season:

New teams

Changes

Withdrew / on hiatus

Personnel and sponsorship

Standings and results

Northeast Region
The region held its annual general meeting in New York, New York, on January 19 at the New York Athletic Club.  The region had a third conference for the first time, with the Mid-Atlantic Conference joining the region.  The Atlantic Conference was also renamed the North Atlantic Conference.

North Atlantic Conference
The conference included 7 teams spread across 6 different states for the 2014 season with the addition of expansion club Greater Lowell United FC.  Kabba Joof, Head Coach of Rhode Island Reds FC served as the Conference commissioner.  The maximum travel distance for the season was between Seacoast United Mariners and the New York City area clubs at just over 300 miles.  The Conference was called simply the Atlantic Conference in previous seasons.

Keystone Conference

Mid-Atlantic Conference

South Region
The region held its annual general meeting in Philadelphia, Pennsylvania, on January 17 during the NSCAA Annual Convention. In 2014 the South Region was split between four Conferences.  Prior to the season, the Mid-Atlantic Conference was split in two with some teams joining the Northeast Region – Mid-Atlantic Conference and some forming the new South Atlantic Conference.

South Atlantic Conference

Sunshine Conference
Due to unforeseen circumstances, Puerto Rico FC did not participate in the 2014 NPSL season.

Southeast Conference
In a new format for 2014, the top four teams of the Southeast Conference played for a spot in the South Region playoffs. In past years, the leader at the end of the regular season claimed the title. The host venue for the Southeast Conference Playoffs was selected through a bid process. The winner continued on to the South Region playoffs.

Pensacola started the season but folded on May 29, 2014, negating 4 games already played and cancelling all future games.

South Central Conference
For 2014, the South Central added six new teams, while two teams from 2013 left the Conference.  The Conference was divided into North (Oklahoma City, Tulsa, Joplin, and Liverpool) and South (Fort Worth, Dallas, BCS, San Antonio) Divisions, with four teams in each division.  Each team played the other three teams twice, once home and once away, and the four teams in the other division once, two home and two away, randomly selected.

The top two teams from each division with the most points advanced to the South Central Conference playoffs, with the first place team in the North playing the second place team in the South and the first place team in the South playing the second place team in the North.  The winner of those two games played for the South Central Conference Championship.

A preseason tournament called the Red River Cup between Tulsa, Oklahoma City FC, Liverpool Warriors, and Fort Worth was hosted by Tulsa on May 2 and 3.

Playoff dates for the South Central Conference will be Friday, July 11 with the final on Sunday, July 13. The winner continued on to the South Region playoffs.

North Division

South Division

Midwest Region
The region held its annual general meeting in Madison, Wisconsin, on January 11.

The Great Lakes Conference has been split into two conferences: Great Lakes West (Detroit, Dearborn, Lansing, Cincinnati, Westfield) and Great Lakes East (Erie, Cleveland, Pittsburgh, Buffalo).  Teams played a total of 14 games with a single match up against teams from the other Great Lakes Conference.

The Midwest Region Champion was decided by a weekend tournament among the winner of each of the three conferences, as well as one wild card team.  The wild card was awarded to the remaining team from among all the conferences with the highest regular season points-per-game. Seeding for the playoff weekend was determined by points-per-game over the regular season.

Two semi-final matches took place on Saturday, July 19 with a final taking place on Sunday, July 20.
 Each conference champion receives a playoff berth.  The next best team based on points per game receives a playoff berth as the wildcard team.

Great Lakes East Conference

Great Lakes West Conference

Central Conference

West Region
For 2014, a new Northwest Conference was added.  This brought the number of Conferences in the West Region to three.  The region held its annual general meeting in San Diego, California, on January 12.

Southwest Conference

Golden Gate Conference

Northwest Conference

Conference playoffs

Sunshine Conference Playoff
The Sunshine Conference played a conference playoff from July 10-12th with the top four teams in the conference participating.  The entire playoffs was held at one location.

Southeast Conference Playoff
In a new format for 2014, the top four teams of the Southeast Conference played for a spot in the South Region playoffs. The host venue for the Southeast Conference Playoffs was Finley Stadium in Chattanooga. The winner continued on to the South Region playoffs.

South Central Conference Playoff
The top two teams from each division with the most points advanced to the South Central Conference playoffs, with the first place team in the North playing the second place team in the South and the first place team in the South playing the second place team in the North.  The winner of those two games played for the South Central Conference Championship. The winner continued on to the South Region playoffs.

Regional and national playoffs

*Conference Champions
Bold Winner
italics Team with home-field advantage

References

 
2014
2014 in American soccer leagues